Knut Håland  is a Norwegian handball player.

He made his debut on the Norwegian national team in 1990, 
and played 30 matches for the national team between 1990 and 1993. He participated at the 1993 World Men's Handball Championship.

References

Living people
Norwegian male handball players
1965 births
Sportspeople from Stavanger